Recintona cnephasiodes is a species of moth of the family Tortricidae. It is found in Chile in the Maule and Bío Bío regions.

References

Moths described in 1999
Euliini
Moths of South America
Taxa named by Józef Razowski
Endemic fauna of Chile